Nermin Vazda  (born 30 August 1967) is a Bosnian retired professional footballer who played as a forward.

Club career
Vazda started off his career at his hometown club Drina HE Višegrad, before moving to Sarajevo and signing with the youth team of FK Sarajevo, for who he played until 1985, before getting moved up to the first team in the same year.

In 1989, he left Sarajevo and went to Leotar, for who he played one year. After leaving Leotar in 1990, Vazda came back to Sarajevo and signed with Željezničar. He stayed at Željezničar until 1993, making 24 league appearances in the process and scoring 16 goals.

With the start of the Bosnian War, Vazda left Željezničar and Bosnia as well, going to Turkey and signing with Sarıyer in July 1993. After two years at Sarıyer, in 1995 he signed with German club Türkiyemspor Berlin. After a great season with Türkiyemspor, scoring 24 goals in 25 league games in the Berlin-Liga (German sixth level), Vazda came back to Bosnia after the war ended and signed a contract with rising club Bosna Visoko.

In the summer of 1997, six years after leaving the club, he came back to Željezničar. Vazda won his first trophy with Željezničar in the 1997–98 season, the First League of Bosnia and Herzegovina, after beating former club Sarajevo 1–0 in the Play-off final. He scored 19 goals for the club in the 1997–98 season, making him joint-top goalscorer of the league. He was also the 1996–97 and 1998–99 season top goalscorer, scoring 17 and 18 goals respectively. On 25 November 1998, he also won the Bosnian Supercup with Željezničar, once again beating Sarajevo, this time 4–0 at the Grbavica Stadium.

In June 1999, after the end of the 1998–99 season, Vazda decided to end his football career at the age of 31. He played 83 league matches for Željezničar and scored 52 goals with an goal average of 0,64 goals per game, making him one of the best all time goalscorers in the history of Željezničar. In his career, he played 227 league games and scored 107 goals.

International career
Vazda played in four matches for the Bosnia and Herzegovina national team, all of the matches being friendly games at the 1997 Dunhill Cup in Malaysia.

Personal life
Vazda's son Anes is also a professional footballer who currently plays as a midfielder for Bosnian Premier League club Mladost Doboj Kakanj.

Honours

Player
Željezničar
First League of Bosnia and Herzegovina: 1997–98
Bosnian Supercup: 1998

Individual
Performance
First League of Bosnia and Herzegovina Top Goalscorer: 1996–97 (17 goals), 1997–98 (19 goals), 1998–99 (18 goals)

References

External links

Nermin Vazda at Soccerway
Nermin Vazda at tff.org

1967 births
Living people
People from Višegrad
Association football forwards
Yugoslav footballers
Bosnia and Herzegovina footballers
Bosnia and Herzegovina international footballers
FK Sarajevo players
FK Leotar players
FK Željezničar Sarajevo players
Sarıyer S.K. footballers
Türkiyemspor Berlin players
NK Bosna Visoko players
Yugoslav First League players
Yugoslav Second League players
Süper Lig players
TFF First League players
Oberliga (football) players
Premier League of Bosnia and Herzegovina players
Bosnia and Herzegovina expatriate footballers
Expatriate footballers in Germany
Bosnia and Herzegovina expatriate sportspeople in Germany
Expatriate footballers in Turkey
Bosnia and Herzegovina expatriate sportspeople in Turkey